Matjhabeng Local Municipality is a local government serving an administrative area in the Lejweleputswa District of the Free State in South Africa. The municipality services Welkom, Virginia, Odendaalsrus and Allanridge. The name is a Sesotho word meaning "where nations meet". It is derived from the migrant labour system where people from various countries like Lesotho, Mozambique, etc. meet to work in the mines of the Goldfields.

Reported corruption
In 2011 the municipality came into the news as one of the worst examples of the widespread corruption under the ANC. In about four years about R2bn went missing. An enquiry led by the MEC Mosebenzi Zwane blamed the losses on the municipal manager Ben Malakoane and his predecessor Thabo Pietersen. Zwane's report slated Malakoane as "grossly negligent", "undermining the rule of law" and engaging in contracts "without due process", but premier Ace Magashule referred to the duo as his "comrades". In 2021 five officials of the municipality were arrested by the Hawks after over R1 million of municipal funds was allegedly misspent. One of the accused was involved in appointing the remaining accused as municipal officials.

Socioeconomic issues
The municipality experiences high unemployment which was exacerbated by the covid-19 pandemic. As of 2021, about 150,000 adults are unemployed. Some 10 gold mines closed their shafts, and suppliers of these mines closed shop. Crime has increased in its towns and townships, especially in Meloding, Virginia, Thabong and Welkom. The reported crimes include theft and vandalism of municipal property and infrastructure, besides illegal mining by zama zamas, costly cable theft, theft of fencing material and vandalism of cemeteries.

Geography
According to the 2011 census it has a population of 406,461 people in 123,195 households. Of this population, 88% describe themselves as "Black African", 10% as "White", and 2% as "Coloured". The first language of 64% of the population is Sotho, while 12% speak Xhosa, 12% speak Afrikaans and 4% speak English.

In the western part of the municipality there is a string of mining towns that runs from northwest to southeast: Allanridge (pop. 19,337), Odendaalsrus (pop. 63,743), Welkom (pop. 211,011) and Virginia (pop. 66,208). Further to the east are the agricultural towns of Hennenman (pop. 24,355) and Ventersburg (pop. 11,260).

Politics 

The municipal council consists of seventy-two members elected by mixed-member proportional representation. Thirty-six councillors are elected by first-past-the-post voting in thirty-six wards, while the remaining thirty-six are chosen from party lists so that the total number of party representatives is proportional to the number of votes received. In the election of 3 August 2016 the African National Congress (ANC) won a majority of forty-six seats in the council.
The following table shows the results of the election.

In a by-election held on 23 August 2017, a ward previously held by a DA councillor was won by the candidate from the United Front of Civics. DA won the ward back in another by-election held on 11 November 2020. The 2016 council composition was thus restored.

References

External links
 Official website

Local municipalities of the Lejweleputswa District Municipality